Mulfra is a hamlet in the parish of Madron, Cornwall, England and is on the southern slope of Mulfra HIll. Nearby is the Scheduled monument, Mulfra Quoit, which is a portal dolmen, i.e. a ceremonial and funerary monument dating from the early or middle Neolithic period, probably in use from 3500 to 2600 BC.

References

Hamlets in Cornwall
Penwith